Brykino is a rural locality (a village) in Golovinskoye Rural Settlement, Sudogodsky District, Vladimir Oblast, Russia. The population was 5 as of 2010.

Geography 
The village is located 10 km south-east from Golovino, 19 km west from Sudogda.

References 

Rural localities in Sudogodsky District